PlanMaker is a spreadsheet program that is part of the SoftMaker Office suite. Versions are available on Microsoft Windows, MacOS, Linux and Apps for Android and iOS.

PlanMaker is largely similar to Microsoft Excel in function and workflow and uses the same file format .xlsx. However, it includes a number of improvements, notably the styling and graphical effects in graphs and charts.

External links 
 SoftMaker's PlanMaker

References 

Spreadsheet software
Presentation software for Windows
Linux software
Windows Mobile software
Android (operating system) software